This is a list of people who served as Lord Lieutenant of Orkney and Shetland. The Lieutenancy was replaced by two Lieutenancies, the Lord Lieutenant of Orkney and the Lord Lieutenant of Shetland, in 1948.

 James Douglas, 11th Earl of Morton 1715 – ?

 George Douglas, 13th Earl of Morton 1735 – 1738
 
 The Lord Dundas 17 March 1794 – 14 June 1820
 vacant
 The Earl of Zetland 10 May 1831 – 19 February 1839
 John Dundas 30 March 1839 – 14 February 1866
 Frederick Dundas 7 March 1866 – 26 October 1872
 John Dundas 18 December 1872 – 13 September 1892
 Malcolm Alfred Laing 5 November 1892 – 10 December 1917
 vacant
 Sir William Cheyne, Bt 1919 – 1930
 Alfred Baikie 1930–1947

Vice Lieutenants
 Lieutenant-General Frederick William Traill-Burroughs, CB 17 January 1900

References

Orkney and Shetland
Orkney
Shetland
Politics of Orkney
Politics of Shetland